Billington may refer to:

Billington (surname)
Billington, Bedfordshire, a small parish in England, United Kingdom
Billington, Lancashire, a larger village in England, United Kingdom
Billington Heights, New York, a hamlet in New York, United States
The Billington Food Group (aka Billington's), a sugar company in both the United States and the United Kingdom